Triaspis is a genus in the Malpighiaceae, a family of about 75 genera of flowering plants in the order Malpighiales. Triaspis comprises ca. 15 species of vines and shrubs native to sub-Saharan Africa.

Species

Gallery

External links
 Malpighiaceae Malpighiaceae - description, taxonomy, phylogeny, and nomenclature

Malpighiaceae
Malpighiaceae genera